Gadhpuri is a village in the Palwal district of Haryana, India.

Demographics

Per the 2011 Census of India, Gadhpuri had a total population of 1639 people; 880 of them male and 759 female.

References

Villages in Palwal district